The Kulina are an indigenous people of Brazil and Peru. 2,540 Kulina live in Amazonas and Acre in Brazil; while 400 live in southeastern Peru, along the Purus and Santa Rosa Rivers.

Name
Besides Kulina, they are also called Corina, Culina, Kulína, Kulyna, Madihá, and Madija.

Language
Kulina people speak the Kulina language, which is an Arawan language. Parts of the Bible have been translated into Kulina.

References

External links
 Kulina artwork, National Museum of the American Indian

Indigenous peoples in Brazil
Indigenous peoples in Peru
Indigenous peoples of the Amazon